Mimoreovirus is a genus of viruses, in the family Reoviridae, in the subfamily Sedoreovirinae. The only isolate infects the marine photosynthetic protist Micromonas pusilla, a prasinophyte. There is only one species in this genus: Micromonas pusilla reovirus.

Structure
Viruses in Mimoreovirus are non-enveloped, with icosahedral geometries, and T=13, T=2 symmetry. The diameter is around 90-95 nm. Genomes are linear and segmented, around 15.8kb in length. The genome codes for 11 proteins.

Life cycle
Viral replication is cytoplasmic. Entry into the host cell is achieved by attachment to host receptors, which mediates endocytosis. Replication follows the double-stranded RNA virus replication model. Double-stranded RNA virus transcription is the method of transcription. The virus exits the host cell by monopartite non-tubule guided viral movement. Marine photosynthetic protists serve as the natural host. Transmission routes are passive diffusion.

References

External links
 Viralzone: Mimoreovirus
 ICTV

Virus genera
Sedoreovirinae